Vichai Limcharoen (born 1936) is a Thai boxer. He competed in the men's bantamweight event at the 1956 Summer Olympics.

References

1936 births
Living people
Vichai Limcharoen
Vichai Limcharoen
Boxers at the 1956 Summer Olympics
Place of birth missing (living people)
Bantamweight boxers